On the Offensive is an EP released by Poster Children in 2004.  It is composed of politically themed cover songs.

Track listing
 "Clampdown" – 3:17 (originally by the Clash)
 "(We Don't Need This) Fascist Groove Thang" – 3:16 (originally by Heaven 17)
 "The New World" – 3:33 (originally by X)
 "Let's Have a War" – 2:06 (originally by Fear)
 "Divide and Conquer" – 2:55 (originally by Hüsker Dü)
 "Complicated Game" – 4:53 (originally by XTC)

Reception
Pitchfork gave it 7.0. Allmusic gave it 3.5 stars, with Tim Sendra describing it as "an impassioned antiwar, anti-Bush statement...a fun listen". PopMatters gave it 6 stars, with Christine Klunk stating that it "shows The Poster Children at their sharpest and tightest".

Personnel
Rick Valentin – Vocals, Guitar
Rose Marshack – Bass, vocals
Jim Valentin – Guitar
Matt Friscia – Drums

References

Poster Children albums
2004 EPs
Concept albums
Covers EPs